Ptinus pilosus is a species of beetles in the genus Ptinus of the family Ptinidae. This species was first described in 1821 by Philipp Wilbrand Jacob Müller.

References

pilosus
Beetles described in 1821